In the Time Before Llamas is an album by the Canadian alt-country band Cowboy Junkies, released in 2003. It is a live album, compiling tracks from two concerts in the United Kingdom. It was released only in the UK, where the 2000 live album Waltz Across America was not released, but is available as an import in other countries.

Track listing 

Tracks 1-11 were recorded at the Royal Exchange Theatre in Manchester on May 1, 1990. Tracks 12-17 were recorded at the Royal Albert Hall in London on March 6, 1992.

References

External links 

Cowboy Junkies live albums
2003 live albums
Live albums recorded at the Royal Albert Hall
BBC Radio recordings